Pawlak is a Polish surname, it may refer to:

People
 Aleksander Pawlak, Polish footballer
 Alicja Pawlak, Polish footballer
 Joanna Pawlak, Polish equestrian
 Krzysztof Pawlak (born 1958), retired Polish football player
 Mariusz Pawlak (born 1972), retired Polish professional footballer
 Mark Pawlak (born 1948), Polish-American poet and educator
 Mirosław Pawlak (born 1942), Polish politician
 Paul Pawlak, Sr., American politician
 Paul Pawlak (born 1940), former American football coach in the United States
 Rafał Pawlak, Polish football player and manager
 Stanisław Pawlak (born 1933), Polish diplomat and international law scholar
 Szymon Pawlak (born 1987), Polish footballer
 Thomas A. Pawlak III (born 1981), American Businessman
 Waldemar Pawlak (born 1959), Polish politician
First Cabinet of Waldemar Pawlak (1992), a Polish government
Second Cabinet of Waldemar Pawlak (1993–1995), a Polish government
 Zdzisław Pawlak, inventor of the negabinary (-2 base) numeral system used in UMC computers

See also
Palak (disambiguation)
Polak

Polish-language surnames